Little Things is the first studio album by the American pop rock recording artist Toby Lightman, released on March 30, 2004, by Lava Records. The album peaked at #200 on the Billboard 200, and is Lightman's only album to appear on the chart.

Two singles were released from the original album: "Devils and Angels" and "Everyday". The album was re-released on July 20, 2004, with the addition of a cover version of Mary J. Blige's "Real Love", which was the album's third single.

Track listing

Production credits

Rob Mounsey – string arrangements
David Mann – saxophone
Nile Rodgers – electric guitar
Tom Lord-Alge – mixing
Tom Barney – bass guitar, upright bass
Bashiri Johnson – percussion
Joe Bonadio – percussion
Matt Brown – engineer
Jimmy Douglass – mixing
Chris Gehringer – mastering
Jesse Levy – cello
Rob Mathes – conductor, horn arrangements
Ozzie Melendez – trombone
Sandra Park – violin
Leon Pendarvis – conductor, string arrangements
Andy Snitzer – saxophone
Richard Travali – mixing
Gerry Leonard – electric gitar
Lynn Kowalewski – art direction
Femio Hernández – engineer
Peter Zizzo – acoustic guitar, bass guitar, piano, drums, electric guitar, keyboards, producer, engineer, executive producer, tiple, digital editing, vocal arrangement, drum programming, synthesizer bass, keyboard programming, synthesizer piano, pianette
Ariel Martin – management
FS – beats
Steve Penny – assistant
William Gallison – harmonica
Jen Scaturro – keyboards, programming, digital editing, keyboard programming ("Devils and Angels", "The River", "Frightened", "Front Row", "Coming Back In", "Is This Right?")
Nikki Hirsch – product manager
Andrew Karp – A&R
Steve Rakidzioski – assistant
Toby Lightman – acoustic guitar, drums, lead vocals, background vocals, executive producer, vocal arrangement, drum programming

Chart positions

Notes

References

2004 debut albums
Lava Records albums
Toby Lightman albums